The Homecoming, (German: Die Heimkehr) also known as The Return or Returning Home, is a painting by the Swiss Symbolist artist Arnold Böcklin (1827–1901). It was painted by the artist in 1887, and is in a private collection.

Description 
The painting depicts a man sitting on the edge of a square pool of water, facing away from the angle of viewing. His back is reflected in the water. He looks forward to a house, which sits in a shadow cast by a group of trees.

Interpretation 
In 1886, Böcklin moved from Florence to Zürich, meaning he was back in his homeland Switzerland for the first time since his youth. The Homecoming could be interpreted as representing his own "homecoming" to Switzerland.

Rachmaninoff's Prelude No. 10 in B minor, Op. 32 
The Russian composer Sergei Rachmaninoff was inspired by The Homecoming when he wrote his Prelude No. 10 in B minor, Op. 32. Valentine Antipov believed that the title The Return was relevant to the narrative of the set of preludes.

Another composition by Rachmaninoff, his symphonic poem Isle of the Dead was inspired by Böcklin's painting of the same name.

See Also 

 List of paintings by Arnold Böcklin
 Preludes, Op. 32 (Rachmaninoff)

References

Paintings by Arnold Böcklin
Symbolist paintings
1887 paintings